Brontis Jodorowsky (born 27 October 1962) is a Mexican-French actor and theatre director. He is the son of Chilean-French writer, director and actor Alejandro Jodorowsky and French actress Bernadette Landru.

Life and career
Jodorowsky was born in Mexico. His first film experience was a prominent role in his father's 1970 film El Topo.

When he was 12 years old, his father cast him in a planned film adaptation of Dune by Frank Herbert. He was trained to play the part of the novel's protagonist, Paul Atreides. He had been taught by Jean-Pierre Vignau, a famous French coach in Japanese jujitsu, karate, judo, aikido, and also knife and sword combat. His training was intensive: 6 hours a day, seven days a week over a period of two years until the film project was shelved. Brontis described the training as painful and merciless.

Jodorowsky received his acting training in Parisian theatres and at the Conservatoire du XIVe. In 2011 he attended a three-month workshop at the New York Film Academy and in 2013 graduated from the Studio Theatre D'Asnières in France.

He also has a career in theatre, directing and performing in numerous plays, most of them in Paris. Many of his works were presented at the Théâtre Du Soleil. He is also known for his Atrides series of plays. (Atreides is both the name of descendants of the Greek mythological figure Atreus and the name of the protagonist family in Frank Herbert's Dune novels.)

In 1991 his daughter, Alma Jodorowsky, was born. She is a French model, singer and actress.

In 2009, he wrote and directed a play with his father and was also an actor in Le Gorille (The Gorilla) which became one of his better-known pieces.

In the film La Danza De La Realidad (The Dance Of Reality), he had to play the role of his grandfather whom he'd never known or seen in person since he died before Brontis was born. Through his father's direction of the film, he discovered much about his father and what he had endured over his lifetime. He reprised the role of Jaime Jodorowsky in the film's sequel, Endless Poetry, which, like La Danza De La Realidad, was also inspired by his father's life experiences, this time focusing on Alejandro's youth and discovery of poetry.

Theatre

Plays (as director)
2000: Le Médecin volant (Molière)
2000: Qu’est-ce que ça peut faire (Christian Ferrari)
2000: Haute surveillance (Jean Genet)
2006: L'Inattendu (Fabrice Melquiot)
2009: Pelléas et Mélisande (Maurice Maeterlinck)
2009: Le Gorille (Brontis Jodorowsky and Alejandro Jodorowsky)
2011: Rigoletto (Verdi)
2011: L’Inattendu (Fabrice Melquiot)

Plays (as actor)
1989: La Nuit miraculeuse (Hélène Cixous)
1990: Les Atrides: Iphigénie à Aulis (Euripides)
1990: Les Atrides: Agamemnon (Eschylus)
1991: Les Atrides: Les Choéphores (Eschylus)
1992: Les Atrides: Les Euménides (Eschylus)
1994: La Ville parjure ou le Réveil des Erinyes (Hélène Cixous)
1995: Le Tartuffe (Molière)
1995: Anthropologies (Pablo Abad)
1995: Pierre et le loup (Sergey Prokofiev)
1995: Le Songe d'une nuit d'été (Shakespeare)
1995: Macbeth (Shakespeare)
1997: Le Bon Dieu de Manhattan (Ingeborg Bachmann)
1998: Giacomo le tyrannique (Giuseppe Manfridi)
1998: Peines d'amour perdues (Shakespeare)
1999: Danser à Lughnasa de (Brian Friel)
2000: L’Ultime Chant de Troie (Euripides, Eschylus, Seneca and Parouir Sévak)
2001: Opéra panique (Alejandro Jodorowsky)
2001: L’Évangile selon Judas (From The Bible)
2001: Mon pauvre Fiedia (Fyodor Dostoevsky)
2001: En attendant Godot (Samuel Beckett)
2004: Un homme est un homme (Bertolt Brecht)
2005: Troïlus et Cressida (Shakespeare)
2005: Merlin ou la terre dévastée (Tankred Dorst)
2006: Tragedy: a tragedy (Will Eno)
2006: La Marquise d'O (Heinrich von Kleist)
2009: Le Gorille (Franz Kafka)

Filmography 

He is also credited in the short film Echek in the "thanks" section.

Television series
 Largo Winch (2002)
Character: Landis
Episode: Flashback

 Section de recherches (2007)
Character: Patrick Venderlen
Episode: Vents contraires

Voice dub
 Matrimoni (1998)
Character: Paolo Sessanelli

References

External links
 

1962 births
Living people
Mexican emigrants to France
Mexican male stage actors
Mexican male film actors
Mexican people of Ukrainian-Jewish descent
Mexican people of Chilean descent
20th-century Mexican male actors
21st-century Mexican male actors
French theatre directors